An apostolate is a Christian organization "directed to serving and evangelizing the world", most often associated with the Anglican Communion or the Catholic Church. In more general usage, an apostolate is an association of persons dedicated to the propagation of a religion or a doctrine. The word apostolate comes from the Greek word apostello, which means to "send forth" or "to dispatch". The Christian origin of the word comes from the twelve apostles who were selected by Christ; they had a "special vocation, a formal appointment of the Lord to a determined office, with connected authority and duties". An apostolate can be a Christian organization made up of the laity or of a specific Christian religious order.

Apostolate as ministry
Within Anglican theology and Catholic theology, "ministry" pertains to the administration of a sacrament; or the celebration of liturgy and all that pertains to the liturgical functioning of the Church; as such it is specific to those with Holy Orders. Laity have a different role, namely, to spread the truth of Christianity in the world through whatever means they can — this is properly called an apostolate. An example of a Catholic apostolate is Catholic Answers, run by laity whose mission is to spread the Gospel of Jesus Christ and Catholicism in the world. Similarly, an example of an Anglican apostolate is The Saint Martin Apostolate of Prayer, whose aim is the "sanctification of all priests through the continual offering of prayers on their behalf by the faithful."

See also 

 Apostle (Christian)
 Christian ministry, as age-specific ministry, creative and performing arts, community service and outreach.
 Lay apostolate
 Sodality

Further reading

References

Catholic theology and doctrine